The West Branch Division of the Pennsylvania Canal ran  from the canal basin at Northumberland, Pennsylvania, at the confluence of the West Branch Susquehanna River with the main stem of the Susquehanna River, north through Muncy, then west through Williamsport, Jersey Shore, and Lock Haven to its terminus in Farrandsville.
At its southern terminus in the Northumberland basin, the West Branch Canal met the North Branch Canal and the Susquehanna Division Canal. Through these connections to other divisions of the Pennsylvania Canal, it formed part of a multi-state water transportation system including the Main Line of Public Works.

Between Northumberland and Muncy, the canal lay east of the river. Beyond Muncy, where the river makes a right-angle turn, the canal lay to the north. The locks, beginning with No. 13, slightly upstream of the Northumberland Canal Basin, and ending with No. 34 at Lockport, across the river from Lock Haven, included two guard locks and an outlet lock in addition to the 19 lift locks.

The state intended to extend the West Branch Canal from Farrandsville further upstream along the West Branch Susquehanna River to the mouth of Sinnemahoning Creek.

Extensions
Additions to the West Branch Canal included the Bald Eagle Crosscut Canal, which ran  through Lock Haven and Flemington along Bald Eagle Creek. It linked the West Branch Canal to a privately financed addition, the Bald Eagle and Spring Creek Navigation, that extended the canal system another  to Bellefonte along Bald Eagle and Spring creeks. Beginning in 1837, large quantities of pig iron and bituminous coal traveled to distant markets via these canals.

The Lock Haven Dam (also known as the Dunnstown Dam), was built in the 19th century primarily to provide water to the West Branch Canal. Canal boats crossed the pool behind the dam using a cable ferry between Lock No. 35 on the Lock Haven (Bald Eagle Crosscut Canal) side of the river and Lock No. 34 on the Lockport (West Branch Canal) side, about  downriver from the Jay Street Bridge.

Locks

Remnants
Remnants of the canal exist along the West Branch Susquehanna River between Northumberland and Lock Haven. Canal walls made of stone still stand near Muncy, while other canal and lock remnants are preserved near Lock Haven. Archaeological work and restoration began in 2005 at the Muncy Canal Heritage Park and Nature Trail,  including remains of a towpath, a lock, a canal wall, and a lock tender's house. Part of the Bald Eagle Crosscut Canal still flows along Bald Eagle Creek through Flemington. Lock No. 32 has been preserved in Jersey Shore.

Points of interest

See also
 List of canals in the United States

Notes and references
Notes

References

Works cited
 McCullough, Robert, and Leuba, Walter (1973) [1962]. The Pennsylvania Main Line Canal. York, Pennsylvania: The American Canal and Transportation Center. 
 Shank, William H. (1986) [1981]. The Amazing Pennsylvania Canals (150th Anniversary Edition). York, Pennsylvania: The American Canal and Transportation Center. .

External links

Pennsylvania Canal Society
American Canal Society
National Canal Museum

Canals in Pennsylvania
Historic American Engineering Record in Pennsylvania
Transportation buildings and structures in Clinton County, Pennsylvania
Transportation buildings and structures in Lycoming County, Pennsylvania
Transportation buildings and structures in Northumberland County, Pennsylvania
Transportation buildings and structures in Union County, Pennsylvania
West Branch Susquehanna River
Canals opened in 1835